The Costa Blanca Benidorm Senior Golf Masters is a men's professional golf tournament for players aged 50 and above which is part of the European Senior Tour. It was first held in late November and early December 2018 at Meliã Villaitana Golf Club, Benidorm, Spain. It was the first European Senior Event to be held in Spain since 2012.

Paul Streeter won the inaugural event, beating Miguel Ángel Jiménez in a playoff. Streeter birdied the first playoff. Earlier he had taken a one stroke lead to the final hole but took a bogey 5.

Winners

References

External links
Coverage on the European Senior Tour's official site

European Senior Tour events
Golf tournaments in Spain
Recurring sporting events established in 2018